Asprosaurus is an extinct genus of anguimorph lizard from the Late Cretaceous of South Korea. Named in 2015 from the Seonso Conglomerate Formation, the type species Asprosaurus bibongriensis is the first Mesozoic lizard to have been discovered on the Korean peninsula. Because Asprosaurus is known only from fragmentary material, its relationships with other lizards are uncertain. However, features of the lower jaw suggest that it may be a member of a clade (evolutionary grouping) called Monstersauria, which includes the living Gila monster.

Size 

References 

Late Cretaceous lepidosaurs of Asia
Campanian life
Santonian life
Fossils of South Korea
Fossil taxa described in 2015